Balangestan (also Romanized as Bālangestān and Bālangistān; also known as Golestān (Persian: گلستان) and Palangestān) is a village in Kabgan Rural District, Kaki District, Dashti County, Bushehr Province, Iran. At the 2006 census, its population was 570, in 140 families.

References 

Populated places in Dashti County